The 1965 Hong Lim by-election was held on 10 July 1965, with the nomination day held on 30 June 1965. Merely a month before Singapore's separation from Malaysia and independence, UPP chief, and the party's sole Assembly Member Ong Eng Guan resigned his seat and retired from politics, triggering a by-election.

Background
This last Legislative Assembly election became a straight fight between Singapore's two main parties, the People's Action Party (PAP) and Barisan Sosialis (BS), and both fielded former PAP AMs as candidates. The PAP was by then a full national party with a presence in Malaysia, despite winning only one seat of the 11 it contested in the federal election of 1964. 

After Singapore was ejected from the Federation, PAP's only Malaysian legislator, Devan Nair, converted the party's extension into the Peninsular Malaysia into the Democratic Action Party (DAP), replacing the "thunderflash" in the PAP's symbol with a "rocket", but a few years later he quit Malaysia politics and returned to Singapore. The DAP remains a political party in Malaysia to this day, being as of 2019 part of the Pakatan Harapan coalition.

Historical significance
This was the last Legislative Assembly election to see a straight fight between the PAP and BS.

The following year, BS withdrew all its members from parliament; it went on to boycott the next election, in 1968.

Election deposit
The election deposit was set at $500.

Results

References
Background of 1965 Hong Lim By Election
1965 Hong Lim By Election's Results

1965
1965 elections in Asia
1965 in Singapore